Ron Wright (25 July 1929 – 20 November 2001) was a former Australian rules footballer who played with Fitzroy in the Victorian Football League (VFL).

Notes

External links 		
		
		
		
		
		
		
		
1929 births		
2001 deaths		
Australian rules footballers from Victoria (Australia)		
Fitzroy Football Club players